The Czech Cycling Federation or CSC (in Czech: Český Svaz Cyklistiky) is the national governing body of cycle racing in the Czech Republic.

The CSC is a member of the UCI and the UEC.

External links
 Czech Cycling Federation official website

National members of the European Cycling Union
Cycle racing organizations
Cycling
Cycle racing in the Czech Republic